The Central African Republic national handball team is the national handball team of the Central African Republic.

African Championship record
1974 – 5th place

References

External links
IHF profile

Men's national handball teams
National sports teams of the Central African Republic